Sathish Sivalingam (born 23 June 1992) is an Indian weightlifter who won gold medals in the men's 77 kg weight class at both the 2014 and the 2018 Commonwealth Games. He is supported by the GoSports Foundation through the Rahul Dravid athlete mentorship programme.

Early life 
Sathish was born in Sathuvachari, Vellore, Tamil Nadu, India to Sivalingam and Deivanai. His father Sivalingam an ex-serviceman who won gold medals at national level and now works as a security guard at VIT University, Vellore. Sathish did his schooling in Government Higher Secondary School, Sathuvachari. He works as a clerk in Southern Railways Chennai.

Career
At the 2018 Commonwealth Games he won gold medal in 77 kg category. He lifted 144 kg in snatch games record and 173 kg in clean and jerk.

At the 2014 Commonwealth Games, Sivalingam won the gold medal in the men's 77 kg, with 149 kg snatch, and 179 kg clean and jerk lifts, totalling 328 kg. His lift of 149 kg in the snatch, set a new games record.

Sathish qualified for the 2016 Rio Olympics in the Men's 77 kg category, where he finished 11th in the field of 14 lifters.

Achievements 
Commonwealth Games

Commonwealth Championships

See also
List of people from Vellore

References

External links

Living people
Indian male weightlifters
1992 births
Weightlifters from Tamil Nadu
Commonwealth Games gold medallists for India
Weightlifters at the 2014 Commonwealth Games
Olympic weightlifters of India
Weightlifters at the 2016 Summer Olympics
People from Vellore district
Commonwealth Games medallists in weightlifting
Tamil sportspeople
Weightlifters at the 2018 Asian Games
Asian Games competitors for India
Recipients of the Arjuna Award
Medallists at the 2014 Commonwealth Games